Othe is a commune in the Meurthe-et-Moselle department in north-eastern France. It is an exclave of the Meurthe-et-Moselle department, surrounded by the Meuse department.

Geography 
The village  lies on the right bank of the Othain, which flows northwestward through the commune.

See also 
 Communes of the Meurthe-et-Moselle department

References

Communes of Meurthe-et-Moselle
Enclaves and exclaves